The following is a list of motorcycles manufactured by Velocette, which ran from 1904 to 1971.

Motorcycles

See also

List of AMC motorcycles*
List of Ariel motorcycles
List of BSA motorcycles
List of Royal Enfield motorcycles
List of Triumph motorcycles
List of Vincent motorcycles

Velocette
Velocette